DGF may refer to

Science and technology:
dGH, or degrees of general hardness of water, in chemistry
Delayed graft function, in kidney transplantation
Dissolved gas flotation, an industrial treatment process

Organizations:
DHL Global Forwarding, part of Deutsche Post
DGF Flensborg, a German football club
Dramatists Guild Foundation, an American charity

Other uses:
Danmarks gamle Folkeviser, a collection of texts and recordings of old Danish popular ballads